The Tyrrell 022 was the car with which the Tyrrell team competed in the 1994 Formula One World Championship. The car was powered by the Yamaha OX10B 3.5-litre V10 engine and was driven by Japanese Ukyo Katayama, in his second season with the team, and Briton Mark Blundell, who moved from Ligier.

The 022 was the car with which Tyrrell achieved its final podium finish, courtesy of Blundell at the Spanish Grand Prix.

Race results
(key)

After Formula One
In 2009, one of the Tyrrell 022s was raced in the US BOSS championship.

References

1994 Formula One season cars
Tyrrell Formula One cars